Dundela Football Club, nicknamed "The Duns" is a semi-professional, Northern Irish football club from Belfast, currently playing in the NIFL Championship, and plays its home matches at Wilgar Park. The club's colours are green and white. The home kit has green shirts, green shorts and green socks, whilst the away kit is all red.

History
Dundela Football Club was formed in 1895 from employees of a local dairy owned by the Agnew family and members of a local harriers' club. Wilgar Park has been the home to the club since 1900. The park lies in the heartland of east Belfast, in a suburb named Strandtown. Its capacity is 2,500. The venue is nicknamed "The Hen Run". The club's greatest achievement to date came in April 1955, when it defeated Glenavon by three goals to nil at Windsor Park, Belfast in the final of the Irish Cup. It was the first time a club form the Irish Alliance won the competition. The club's darkest hour occurred on 25 August 1995, when team captain, Michael Goddard died during a game at Stangmore Park, home of Dungannon Swifts, after being struck on the chest with the ball. The club's most recent success was an Intermediate League title in the 2017–18 season. Dundela's local rivals are Harland & Wolff Welders.

Current squad

Honours

Senior honours
Irish Cup: 1
1954–55

Intermediate honours
Irish League B Division/Second Division: 11 (inc. one shared)
1967–68, 1976–77 (shared), 1981–82, 1985–86, 1987–88, 1989–90, 1990–91, 1991–92, 1993–94, 1999–00, 2000–01
Irish Intermediate League: 5
1921–22, 1944–45, 1946–47, 1949–50, 1950–51 
Irish Intermediate Cup: 10
1946–47, 1954–55, 1965–66, 1974–75, 1983–84, 1988–89, 1992–93, 1998–99, 1999–00, 2000–01
George Wilson Cup: 4
1964–65, 1967–68, 1971–72, 1974–75
Steel & Sons Cup: 10
1945–46, 1963–64, 1980–81, 1982–83, 1987–88, 1988–89, 1990–91, 1999–00, 2007–08, 2013–14
B Division Knock-out Cup: 4
1987–88, 1990–91, 1991–92, 1994–95
 McElroy Cup: 1
1945–46 (shared)

Notable former players
 David Lyner
 Eric McMordie
 Billy Caskey
 Matty Burrows
 Laurance Fyfe

References
 

 
Association football clubs established in 1895
Association football clubs in Belfast
1895 establishments in Ireland
NIFL Premier Intermediate League clubs
Association football clubs in Northern Ireland